Tragicomic is an album by American jazz pianist Vijay Iyer, which was recorded in 2007 and released on the Sunnyside label. The follow-up to Reimagining, the record features ten Iyer's compositions for his quartet with Rudresh Mahanthappa on alto sax, Stephan Crump on bass and Marcus Gilmore on drums, and two covers: a dub version of Bud Powell's "Comin' Up" and a solo piano interpretation of the standard "I'm All Smiles".

Reception

In his review for AllMusic, Ken Dryden states "Vijay Iyer and alto saxophonist Rudresh Mahanthappa blend their Indian heritage with the influence of their New York jazz experience in this striking session."

The JazzTimes review by Steve Greenlee says "The music is a marriage of intellect and power, of brains and brawn. Iyer has absorbed Andrew Hill, McCoy Tyner, Matthew Shipp and others, and that fact comes through whether he plays a burner or a ballad."

The All About Jazz review by Troy Collins states "A stunning achievement, Tragicomic is one of the year's best albums."

Track listing
All compositions by Vijay Iyer except where noted.
 "The Weight of Things" – 2:17
 "Macaca Please" – 4:54 
 "Aftermath" – 6:20
 "Comin' Up" (Bud Powell) – 4:26
 "Without Lions" – 2:54
 "Mehndi" – 6:50
 "Age of Everything" – 5:23
 "Window Text" – 5:41
 "I'm All Smiles" (Michael Leonard) – 4:44
 "Machine Days" – 7:26
 "Threnody" – 6:02
 "Becoming" – 3:36

Personnel
 Vijay Iyer – piano
 Rudresh Mahanthappa – alto saxophone
 Stefan Crump – bass
 Marcus Gilmore – drums

References

2008 albums
Vijay Iyer albums
Sunnyside Records albums